Jamie Fellner is senior counsel for the United States Program of Human Rights Watch. The U.S. Program focuses on human rights violations within the United States. From 2004-09, she also served on the U.S. National Prison Rape Elimination Commission.

Education
Jamie Fellner obtained a bachelor's degree from Smith College and went on to obtain her Juris Doctor from Boalt Hall at the University of California-Berkeley. Fellner also completed doctoral work at Stanford University in Latin American history. She also can speak Spanish.

Media appearances
Fellner's work has been widely reported on by the mass media and she has been a guest on numerous television programs. She has appeared as a guest on  ABC Evening News, The Today Show, Hardball, Crossfire, The O'Reilly Factor, All Things Considered, Hannity and Colmes, and BBC News.

Writings
Fellner also wrote articles for different newspapers& such as:
Lethal Injections Ill-Conceived, With Painful Results
Pain and Punishment for Persons with Mental Disabilities Behind Bars in the USA
Power Failure: NYC Judges Penalize The Poor
"US Right to Curb Harsh Drug Sentences", Human Rights Watch
"A Drug Abuse Policy That Fails Everyone", The Huffington Post
US: A Nation Behind Bars, Human Rights Watch, 2014 
 Decent Decision, Huffington Post.
 About mentally ill prisoners. December 2015.
 About mistreatment of inmates,
 US civil Liberties after September 11.

References

Further reading
Fellner, Jamie. "Beyond Reason: Executing Persons with Mental Retardation", Section of Individual Rights & Responsibilities, American Bar Association, Summer 2001, retrieved July 4, 2009.
Godoy, Maria. Q&A Solitary Confinement and Human Rights", National Public Radio, July 27, 2006, retrieved July 4, 2009.

External links
Jamie Fellner, bio from HRW, including links to several articles she penned.

Human Rights Watch people
American lawyers
Living people
American women lawyers
Place of birth missing (living people)
Year of birth missing (living people)
Smith College alumni
UC Berkeley School of Law alumni
21st-century American women